The Football Writers' Association Tribute Award (often called the FWA Tribute Award, or simply the Tribute Award) is given by the Football Writers Association to an individual that the committee feels has made an outstanding contribution to the national game.

The award was first given in 1983, and was won by Ron Greenwood.

All-time winners

Winners by country

References

External links
Football Writers' Association

English football trophies and awards
Awards established in 1983